The 2nd Eastern Provincial Council is the current Eastern Provincial Council, with the membership determined by the results of the 2012 provincial council election held on 8 September 2012. The council met for the first time on 1 October 2012. According to the Constitution of Sri Lanka the maximum term of a provincial council is 5 years from the date of its first meeting.

Election

The 2nd Eastern Provincial Council election was held on 8 September 2012. The incumbent United People's Freedom Alliance (UPFA) lost overall control of the council after winning only 14 of the 37 seats. The Tamil National Alliance (TNA), which had boycotted the previous election, became the second largest group after winning 11 seats. The Sri Lanka Muslim Congress (SLMC) and United National Party won 7 and 4 seats respectively. The National Freedom Front won the remaining seat.

Results

The new provincial council met for the first time on 1 October 2012. Ariyawathi Galappaththy (UPFA-SLFP) and M. S. Subair (UPFA-ACMC) were elected Chairman and Deputy Chairman respectively.

Government/Board of Ministers
The UPFA was able to form an administration with the support of the SLMC. Under the agreement between the UPFA and SLMC a UPFA nominee would serve as Chief Minister for two and half years after a which a SLMC nominee would become Chief Minister. M. N. Abdul Majeed of the UPFA was appointed Chief Minister by Governor Mohan Wijewickrama. Majeed was sworn in on 18 September 2012 in Colombo in front of President Mahinda Rajapaksa. The four government ministers appointed by the Governor with effect from 24 September 2012 were: Ibrahim Mohamed Mohamed Mansoor (SLMC); Meera Sahibu Udumalebbe (UPFA-NC); Dissanayaka Wimalaweera (UPFA-SLFP); and Ahamed Nazeer Zainulabdeen (SLMC). As a result the Sri Lankan Tamils had no representation in the Board of Ministers (the government) despite being the largest ethnic group in the province.

Changes in party/alliance affiliations
A few days after the election there were reports that some TNA councillors were being threatened and coerced into joining the UPFA. It was reported that members of the military intelligence were involved in the threats. G. Krishnapillai, M. Nadarajah, Kumaraswamy Nageswaran, N. Indirakumar and Murugesu Rajeswaran were offered land, money, houses, vehicles and government construction contracts, and threatened with relatives being arrested. None of the TNA councillors gave into the threats and the TNA lodged a complaint with the Election Commissioner.

Members

References
 
 
 
 
 

2012 establishments in Sri Lanka
Eastern Provincial Council